Harpalomimetes is a genus of beetles in the family Carabidae, containing the following species:

 Harpalomimetes orbicollis N. Ito, 1995
 Harpalomimetes schaubergeri Jedlicka, 1932
 Harpalomimetes shibatai Habu, 1969

References

Harpalinae